The Minister of Higher Education, Science, Technology is a Minister in the Cabinet of South Africa, with the responsibility of overseeing the higher education and training components of the Department of Education. Before 10 May 2009 the portfolio formed part of the Ministry of Education, with responsibility for both basic education and higher education, the former now being the responsibility of the Minister of Basic Education.

Ministers with responsibility for Higher Education

References

External links
Ministry of Education
Department of Education

 
Education
Lists of political office-holders in South Africa